The Kimball McCullocoupe is a homebuilt aircraft built around the design of the Clipwing 110 Special Monocoupe.

Development
The McCulloCoupe is an aircraft built as an evolution of air racers starting with the Velie Monocoupe. The Monocoupe evolved into the Monocoupe 110, eventually flown as an air-racer with clipped wings. Ben Howard built a larger version of the Monocoupe, "Mister Mulligan". The Mullicoupe replicas were developed using Pratt & Whitney R-985 Wasp Junior engines. The McCulloCoupe uses a Vedeneyev M14P radial engine with features developed for the Pitts Model 12. Construction began in 2000, with the first flight in 2004.

Design
The McCulloCoupe has side-by-side configuration seating, a high-wing, conventional landing gear and a radial engine. The wings use plywood covering.

Specifications (McCulloCoupe)

References

External links
 Video of Engine Start Up

Homebuilt aircraft
Single-engined tractor aircraft
Aircraft manufactured in the United States
High-wing aircraft
Aircraft first flown in 2004